WROD (1340 kHz) is a commercial AM radio station in Daytona Beach, Florida, and broadcasting a classic rock radio format.  As of June 24, 2015, WROD is owned by Miracle Media LLC.

WROD is a Class C radio station transmitting with 1,000 watts, using a non-directional antenna.  Programming is also heard on 120-watt FM translator 104.7 W284AV in nearby Deltona, Florida.  It uses the FM frequency in its moniker, "104.7 WROD The Rock of Daytona."

History
In 1947, with 250 watts of power, WROD went on the air as Daytona Beach's third radio station. By 1961, WROD was licensed to operate with 1,000 watts of power during the day. The radio station operated from its transmitter site from its beginning to 2005, when its offices moved to 100 Marina Point Drive in Daytona Beach. Later in 2015, after being bought by Miracle Media, the offices moved to 106 Ivy Lane Daytona Beach while the studios found their home at 242 South Beach Street, Daytona Beach.

FM translator W284AV 104.7 went on the air in July 2012 simulcasting WROD.  The station flipped from oldies to classic rock at midnight on January 1, 2015.

References

External links
Official website

FCC History Cards for WROD

1947 establishments in Florida
Classic rock radio stations in the United States
Radio stations established in 1947
ROD